Altdorf is a market town and municipality in the district of Landshut, in Bavaria, Germany. It is situated 4 km northwest of Landshut.

References

Landshut (district)